The Poienița is a right tributary of the river Amaradia in Romania. It flows into the Amaradia in Pojaru.

References

Rivers of Romania
Rivers of Gorj County